The 1928 Cal Aggies football team represented the Northern Branch of the College of Agriculture—now known as the University of California, Davis—as a member of the Far Western Conference (FWC) during the 1928 college football season. Led by first-year head coach Crip Toomey, the Aggies compiled an overall record of 6–3 with a mark of 3–1 in conference play, tying for second place in the FWC. The team outscored its opponents 91 to 41 for the season with five of their victories coming via shutout. The Cal Aggies played home games at Sacramento Stadium in Sacramento, California.

Schedule

Notes

References

Cal Aggies
UC Davis Aggies football seasons
Cal Aggies football